Niemat Kuku is a Sudanese activist,  development expert and a director and co-founder of The Gender Centre for Research and Training (GCRT) in Sudan. Kuku studies and supports women's rights and gender equality in Sudan and was a Reagan-Fascell Democracy Fellow.

Women's rights research 
Kuku has documented the strong role of Sudanese women in the public sphere since the early twentieth century, prior to World War I, during the Anglo–Egyptian colonial control of Sudan. In 2009, around the time of the 2010 Sudanese general election which had originally been planned for 2009, Kuku published a study of the political support for affirmative action via quotas as a practical means of reaching fair participation of women in political processes. She referred to elements of the 2005 Interim National Constitution that promoted affirmative action, "combat" against traditions that undermine women's status and dignity, and provision of maternity rights, medical services and childcare for mothers. She found that the major political parties all supported quotas for women in elections, with quotas varying from 25 to 33 percent. Kuku detailed specific mechanisms required for women's rights and democracy to improve through these elections.

Women's rights activism
Kuku is one of the co-founders of The Gender Centre for Research and Training (GCRT) in Khartoum.

In 2009, in the lead up to the 2010 Sudanese general election, Kuku was active in encouraging women's electoral participation and gaining support from a wide spectrum of political actors.

References 

Sudanese women activists
Living people
Sudanese activists
Year of birth missing (living people)
Place of birth missing (living people)
Sudanese feminists